Chris Yates is an angler, photographer, broadcaster, tea connoisseur and author born on 19 April 1948. He is a former holder of the record for the heaviest-recorded British carp, a 51.5 lb specimen captured from Redmire pool in 1980. Yates is a former co-editor (with Jon Ward-Allen) of Waterlog magazine, and is a regular contributor to The Idler.

Yates prefers vintage tackle, particularly split-cane rods and centrepin reels, and regards cane as superior to any other rod-making material. His books and films emphasise being close to nature as one of the principal pleasures of fishing.

Television series
Yates was one of two central characters in BBC2's 1993 TV series A Passion for Angling, made by Hugh Miles and also featuring Bob James, in which the pair go fishing for carp, salmon and other species across Britain. The series was shown in many countries including Mexico, Hong Kong, New Zealand, Italy, Norway and Japan.

Radio
Between 1996 and 2006 Yates presented numerous BBC radio documentaries, all made by producer Dan Shepherd of Far Shoreline Productions. They included 'Fishing for Doubters', 'The Case of the Missing Burbot', 'Nocturne' and 'Fish Tales'. In 2020, Yates presented 'Reading the Water' for BBC Radio 4, recorded on location at a lake in Wiltshire.

Published works
 The Secret Carp, Merlin Unwin Books 1992
 A Passion for Angling (with Rodger McPhail), BBC Books/Merlin Unwin Books 1993
 Casting at the Sun, Medlar Press limited edition 1986, Classics edition 2006
 The Deepening Pool, Unwin Hyman 1990
 Falling In Again, Merlin Unwin Books 1998
 Four Seasons, Medlar Press 1996, 2nd Edition 2008
 River Diaries, Medlar Press 1997, 2nd Edition 2010
 The River Prince, (Ed.) Medlar Press 1998, 2nd Edition 2009
 Shadows & Reflections, (Ed.) Medlar Press 1999, 2nd Edition 2010
 How to Fish, Hamish Hamilton 2006
 Out of the Blue, Hamish Hamilton 2008
 Night Walk, Collins 2012
 The Lost Diary, Unbound 2013

 ’Lifelines-An Anthology of Angling Anecdotes, and More…‘’ NAROD Publishing, 2021. A collection of 27 short stories centred around angling by 27 different authors including 16.6 by Chris Yates.

References

External links
 A Passion For Angling website
 How to Fish review

Year of birth missing (living people)
Living people
British magazine editors
Angling writers
British fishers